José Javier "Javi" Robles Belmonte (born 3 October 2000) is a Spanish footballer who plays as a central midfielder for Pontevedra CF.

Club career
Born in Almería, Andalusia, Robles joined Real Madrid's La Fábrica in 2015, from UD Almería. He returned to his previous club in 2017, and made his senior debut with the reserves on 12 May 2019, starting and being sent off in a 0–2 Segunda División B away loss against CD El Ejido.

Robles scored his first senior goal on 1 November 2019, netting the equalizer in a 1–1 home draw against CD Huétor Tájar in the Tercera División. He made his first-team debut on 16 August 2021, coming on as a late substitute for Lucas Robertone in a 3–1 Segunda División away win against FC Cartagena.

On 17 July 2022, Robles was loaned to Primera División RFEF side CF Fuenlabrada for the season. The following 31 January, his loan was cut short; he subsequently terminated his link with the Rojiblancos and signed for Pontevedra CF also in the third division.

Honours
Almería
 Segunda División: 2021–22

References

External links
Real Madrid profile 

2000 births
Living people
Footballers from Almería
Spanish footballers
Association football midfielders
Segunda División players
Primera Federación players
Segunda División B players
Tercera División players
UD Almería B players
UD Almería players
CF Fuenlabrada footballers
Pontevedra CF footballers